The 1882 Wellington City mayoral election was part of the New Zealand local elections held that same year to decide who would take the office of Mayor of Wellington.

Background
Incumbent mayor George Fisher sought re-election for a second term and was successful, seeing off a challenge from former city councillor Andrew Young in his third attempt at winning the mayoralty.

Election results
The following table gives the election results:

Notes

References

Mayoral elections in Wellington
1882 elections in New Zealand
Politics of the Wellington Region
1880s in Wellington
November 1882 events